Daniel Sivan (Hebrew: דניאל סיון, born August 21, 1949) is an Israeli Emeritus professor in the Department of Hebrew Language at the Ben-Gurion University of the Negev.

Biography
Daniel Sibboni (later Sivan) was born in Casablanca, Morocco. He immigrated to Israel with his parents Makhluf and Allen and his two brothers Shmuel and Michel. When they arrived by ship from Marseille they were taken to Shikkun Canaan, a neighborhood in Safed. Sibboni's youngest brother, Gabi Siboni, was born there.

In August 1967, Sivan joined the Israel Defense Forces and became a coding instructor in the signals corps at Tzrifin.

Upon completing his military service, he moved to Ramat Gan and studied at the Tel Aviv University. He graduated with a Bachelor of Arts degree in Bible Studies and Hebrew Language in 1970.  Continuing his studies, Sivan  gained a Master of Arts degree in Hebrew and Semitic languages. His thesis focused on "Northwest Semitic in Akkadian texts from Ugarit" and was under the guidance of Professor Anson Frank Rainey. Sivan's thesis for his PhD degree, "Grammar of Northwestern Semitic Vocables in Akkadian Texts from the Land of Israel and Syria in the Middle Bronze Age", was written under the guidance of Professor Gideon Goldenberg and Professor Anson Frank Rainey.

From 2009 to 2011, Sivan  broadcast a weekly jazz program on Radio Darom. He was a member of the band "Koah Meshikha" (Gravity) in which he played the guitar and sang blues and jazz songs with his brother, Gabi Siboni.  After many years, Sivan quit the band, which changed its name to Jukebox.

Sivan is married (for the second time). He has three children with his first wife. His eldest son, Gal (aka James), was the drummer of the Shabbak Samekh band.

Academic career
In October 1979 he was appointed a lecturer in the Department of Hebrew Language at Ben-Gurion University of the Negev, and in 1997 he became a full professor.

In 1986 and 1990, Sivan was a visiting professor at Harvard University and Brandeis University.

Between 2000 and 2004, Sivan held the position of Head of the Department of Hebrew Language and functioned as the Vice-Dean of the Faculty of Humanities and Social Sciences during the tenure of Dean Jimmy Weinblatt. From 1998 to 2013, Sivan was the chairman of Ben-Gurion University's publishing house, and during his tenure more than 150 titles were published.

From 2006 to 2010, Sivan was a member of the Ben-Gurion University Top Nominations Committee.

Collaborating with Professor Maya Fruchtman, Sivan edited the comprehensive "Ariel" dictionary, and together with Dr. Haim Dihi he co-authored the Ariel Aramic-Hebrew Dictionary. Both these dictionaries were published by Korim Publishing House.

Awards and recognition
Sivan won several significant awards during his studies including the Mifal HaPayis award, the Nissim Gaon Award, and the Recanati Family Foundation Award. In 1995, together with Professor Haim Cohen, Sivan received an Honorary Award on behalf of the Israel Science Foundation.

Fields of research 
 The ancient Hebrew language (Biblical Hebrew and proto-biblical Hebrew)
 Northwestern Semitic tongues (Canaanite in Al-Amarna letter, Ugaritic language, Phoenician, and Punic, Hebrew inscriptions from the Biblical age, Ammonite inscriptions)
 Jewish grammarians of the Middle Ages (Hayyuj, Ibn Janah, etc.)

In his research work he focused mainly on the contribution of the languages to the understanding of biblical Hebrew. Among other things, he demonstrated how wrong it is to claim that Ugaritic was a Canaanite language. He demonstrated that Ugaritic had its own characteristic linguistic features, and accordingly it should be regarded as an independent language among the northwestern Semitic languages. It is a mistake to refer to its literature as "Canaanite literature," as some scholars such as Cassuto, Lionstam, and Avishur, have done.

Sivan studied the work of the grammarian Rabbi Yehuda Hayyuj. Sivan has written articles on some of the linguistic concepts in this work, and in 2012, together with Dr. Ali Wattad, he published an annotated, critical edition called "The Three Grammar Essays of Rabbi Yehuda Hayyuj in their Arabic Origin and their Translation to Modern Hebrew," published by Ben-Gurion University of the Negev publishing house.

Published works

Hebrew 
 1993, D. Sivan, Ugaritic Language Grammar, Jerusalem
 2011, Dr. Ali Wattad, Daniel Sivan, The Three Grammar Essays of Rabbi Yehuda Hayyuj in their Arabic Origin and their Translation to Modern Hebrew, a critical edition, Beersheba 5772 (2012)

English 
 1983 (with) C. Cohen, The Ugaritic Hippiatric Texts: A Critical Edition, New Haven.
 1984 Grammatical Analysis and Glossary of the Northwest Semitic Vocables in Akkadian Texts, Münster
 1992 (with) Z. Cochavi-Rainey, West Semitic Vocabulary in Egyptian Script in the 14th–10th Centuries B.C.E.
 1997 The Grammar of the Ugaritic Language, Leiden, New York, Köln

Edited books 
 Tzippora Talshir, Shamir Yona, Daniel Sivan, A Gift to Shmuel: Studies of the Biblical World, Jerusalem
 2003, Pablo-Itzhak Halevi-Kirtschok, Daniel Sivan, Voice of Jacob: A Collection of Essays for Prof. Jacob Ben-Tulila, Beersheba
 2009, Daniel Sivan, David Talshir, Haim Cohen, Revealer of Secrets: Linguistic Studies Presented to Elisha Kimron for his Sixty-Fifth Birthday, Beersheba

References 

 The word Samal originated as an acronym for Hebrew: סגן מחוץ למנין segen mi-khutz la-minyan ("supernumerary deputy") (inspired by the abbreviation "NCO"). Nowadays is no longer treated as an acronym or an abbreviation. See e.g., Avraham Akavia, "Milon le-munkhey tzava" (1951), p. 220, 270; Avraham Even-Shoshan, "Ha-milon ha-khadash" (1967), vol. 4., p. 1814; Yaakov Kna'ani, "Otzar ha-lashon ha-ivrit" (1972), p. 4078; Zeev Shiff, Eitan Habber, "Leksikon le-bitkhon Yisrael" (1976), p. 114; "Milon Sapir" (ed. Eitan Avnian) (1998), vol. 5, p. 2019; Avraham Even-Shoshan, "Milon Even-Shoshan be-shisha krakhim" (2003), vol. 4, p. 1302; "Entziklopedya Karta" (5th edition, 2004), p. 409; "Milon Ariel" (ed. prof. Daniel Sivan and prof. Maya Fruchtman) (2007), p. 765. (Hebrew)
 Sivan, Daniel (1997). A Grammar of the Ugaritic Language (Handbook of Oriental Studies/Handbuch Der Orientalistik). Brill Academic Publishers. . A more concise grammar.
 Daniel Sivan, Selected Publications
  Daniel Sivan on getcited.org: The Ugaritic hippiatric texts: A critical edition
  Peeters Online Journals: The Hitherto Unpublished Columns of the Genesis Apocryphon
 Daniel Sivan on Google Scholar

External links 
 Ben-Gurion University of the Negev – Notable faculty members
 Daniel Sivan, Ben-Gurion faculty active member
 (Hebrew) The Ariel dictionary, wrote by Daniel Sivan and Dr. Haim Dihi
 Daniel Sivan on GoodReads
 Daniel Sivan on Google books
 Daniel Sivan on The Israeli Ministry of Culture and sport
 Daniel Sivan on Radio Darom, Israel

1949 births
Living people
20th-century Moroccan Jews
Israeli people of Moroccan-Jewish descent
Israeli Jews
Jewish Israeli writers
Literary scholars
People from Casablanca